The 2012 women's road cycling season was the second for Team Skil–Argos (started the season under the name Skil 1t4i, UCI code: SKI), which began as Team Skil-Argos in 2010.

Roster

Season victories

Results in major races

Single day races

Grand Tours

UCI World Ranking

The team finished 14th in the UCI ranking for teams.

References

2012 UCI Women's Teams seasons
2012 in Dutch sport
2012 in women's road cycling
2012